Pavlo Rudnytskyy (born 13 July 1988) is a Ukrainian football midfielder. He currently plays for FK Varnsdorf.

External links

Profile at FK Varnsdorf 

1988 births
Living people
Ukrainian footballers
FK Ústí nad Labem players
FK Varnsdorf players
Ukrainian expatriate footballers
Expatriate footballers in the Czech Republic
Association football midfielders
Ukrainian expatriate sportspeople in the Czech Republic
Czech National Football League players